|}

The Deutsches Derby is a Group 1 flat horse race in Germany open to three-year-old thoroughbred colts and fillies. It is run at Hamburg-Horn over a distance of 2,400 metres (about 1½ miles), and it is scheduled to take place each year in July.

It is Germany's equivalent of The Derby, a famous race in England.

History

The event was established in 1869, and it was originally called the Norddeutsches Derby. It became known as the Deutsches Derby in 1889.

For most of its history the race has been held at Hamburg. It has also been staged at Grunewald (1919), Hoppegarten (1943–44), Munich (1946) and Cologne (1947). It was titled the Grosser Deutschlandpreis der Dreijährigen during World War II.

The present system of race grading was introduced in Germany in 1972, and the Deutsches Derby was given Group 1 status.

The race was sponsored by BMW from 1991 to 2008. It was backed by IDEE Kaffee from 2009 to 2011 and Sparda-Bank from 2012 to 2014 before IDEE returned as sponsors from 2015.

Records
Leading jockey (8 wins):
 Gerhard Streit – Orgelton (1938), Wehr Dich (1939), Schwarzgold (1940), Magnat (1941), Allgäu (1943), Solo (1946), Mangon (1952), Baalim (1961)
 Andrasch Starke – Robertico	(1998), Samum (2000), Next Desert (2002), Schiaparelli (2006), Kamsin (2008), Lucky Speed (2013), Nutan (2015), Sisfahan (2021)

Leading trainer (9 wins):
 George Arnull – Mah Jong (1927), Alba (1930), Sturmvogel (1935), Orgelton (1938), Wehr Dich (1939), Schwarzgold (1940), Magnat (1941), Allgäu (1943), Asterblüte (1949)

Leading owner (19 wins):
 Gestüt Schlenderhan – Sieger (1908), Ariel (1914), Marmor (1918), Mah Jong (1927), Alba (1930), Sturmvogel (1935), Orgelton (1938), Wehr Dich (1939), Schwarzgold (1940), Magnat (1941), Allgäu (1943), Asterblüte (1949), Allasch (1953), Don Giovanni (1969), Alpenkönig (1970), Stuyvesant (1976), Adlerflug (2007), Wiener Walzer (2009), In Swoop (2020)

Winners since 1965

 Taishan finished first in 1989, but he was relegated to second place following a stewards' inquiry.

Earlier winners

 1869: Investment
 1870: Adonis
 1871: Bauernfänger
 1872: Hymenaeus 1
 1873: Amalie von Edelreich
 1874: Paul
 1875: Palmyra / Schwindler 2
 1876: Double Zero
 1877: Pirat
 1878: Oroszvar
 1879: Künstlerin
 1880: Gamiani
 1881: Cäsar
 1882: Taurus / Trachenberg 2
 1883: Tartar
 1884: Stronzian
 1885: Budagyöngye
 1886: Potrimpos
 1887: Zsupan
 1888: Tegetthoff
 1889: Uram Batyam
 1890: Dalberg
 1891: Peter
 1892: Espoir
 1893: Geier / Hardenberg 2
 1894: Sperber
 1895: Impuls
 1896: Trollhetta
 1897: Flunkermichel
 1898: Habenichts
 1899: Galifard
 1900: Hagen
 1901: Tuki
 1902: Macdonald
 1903: Bono Modo
 1904: Con Amore
 1905: Patience
 1906: Fels
 1907: Desir
 1908: Sieger
 1909: Arnfried
 1910: Orient
 1911: Chilperic
 1912: Gulliver II
 1913: Turmfalke
 1914: Ariel
 1915: Pontresina
 1916: Amorino
 1917: Landgraf
 1918: Marmor
 1919: Gibraltar
 1920: Herold
 1921: Omen
 1922: Hausfreund
 1923: Augias
 1924: Anmarsch
 1925: Roland
 1926: Ferro
 1927: Mah Jong
 1928: Lupus
 1929: Graf Isolani
 1930: Alba
 1931: Dionys
 1932: Palastpage
 1933: Alchimist
 1934: Athanasius
 1935: Sturmvogel
 1936: Nereide
 1937: Abendfrieden
 1938: Orgelton
 1939: Wehr Dich
 1940: Schwarzgold
 1941: Magnat
 1942: Ticino
 1943: Allgäu
 1944: Nordlicht
 1945: no race
 1946: Solo
 1947: Singlspieler
 1948: Birkhahn
 1949: Asterblüte
 1950: Niederländer
 1951: Neckar
 1952: Mangon
 1953: Allasch
 1954: Kaliber
 1955: Lustige
 1956: Kilometer
 1957: Orsini
 1958: Wilderer
 1959: Uomo
 1960: Alarich
 1961: Baalim
 1962: Herero
 1963: Fanfar
 1964: Zank

1 Primas finished first in 1872, but he was disqualified. Hymenaeus tied with Seemann, but he was awarded victory by the drawing of lots.2 The 1875, 1882 and 1893 races were dead-heats and have joint winners.

See also

 List of German flat horse races

References
 Racing Post:

 galopp-sieger.de – Deutsches Derby.
 horseracingintfed.com – International Federation of Horseracing Authorities – Deutsches Derby (2017).
 pedigreequery.com – Deutsches Derby – Hamburg Horn.
 tbheritage.com – Deutsches Derby.

Flat horse races for three-year-olds
Horse races in Germany
Recurring sporting events established in 1869
Sports competitions in Hamburg
1869 establishments in Germany